Gordon "Shorty" Carpenter (September 24, 1919 – March 8, 1988) was an American basketball player, and part of gold medal winning American basketball team at the 1948 Summer Olympics.

Born in Ash Flat, Arkansas and nicknamed Shorty despite his 6-foot, 6 inch frame, Carpenter played his college basketball at the University of Arkansas, where he was an All-Southwest Conference performer in 1943.  He later played AAU basketball for both the Phillips 66ers and Denver Chevrolets, making AAU All-American teams each year from 1943 to 1947.

He coached the United States men's national basketball team at the 1950 FIBA World Championship, winning the silver medal.

Carpenter was named to the Arkansas Sports Hall of Fame and the Helms Athletic Hall of Fame.  Following his playing career, he became a referee with the Big Eight Conference.

References

External links
Olympic profile
profile as player basketpedya.com
profile as coach basketpedya.com
 

1919 births
1988 deaths
American men's basketball coaches
American men's basketball players
Arkansas Razorbacks men's basketball players
Arkansas Razorbacks men's track and field athletes
Basketball coaches from Arkansas
Basketball players at the 1948 Summer Olympics
Basketball players from Arkansas
Medalists at the 1948 Summer Olympics
Olympic gold medalists for the United States in basketball
People from Sharp County, Arkansas
Phillips 66ers players
United States men's national basketball team coaches
United States men's national basketball team players
Forwards (basketball)